Acetarsol (or acetarsone) is an anti-infective drug.

It was first discovered in 1921 at Pasteur Institute by Ernest Fourneau, and sold under the brand name Stovarsol.It has been given in the form of suppositories.

Acetarsol can be used to make arsthinol.

It has been cancelled and withdrawn from the market since August 12th, 1997.

Medical uses 
Acetarsol has been used for the treatment of diseases such as syphilis, amoebiasis, yaws, trypanosomiasisiasis and malaria. Acetarsol was used for the treatment of Trichomonas Vaginalis and Candida Albicans. In the oral form, acetarsol can be used for the treatment of intestinal amoebiasis. As a suppository, acetarsol was researched to be used for the treatment of proctitis.

Mechanism of Action 
Although the mechanism of action is not fully known, acetarsol may bind to protein-containing sulfhydryl groups located in the parasite, which then creates lethal As-S bonds, which then kills the parasite.

Chemistry and pharmacokinetics 
Acetarsol has the molecular formula N-acetyl-4-hydroxy-m-arsinillic acid, and it is a pentavalent arsenical compound with antiprotozoal and anthelmintic properties. The arsenic found in acetarsol is excreted mainly in urine. The level of arsenic after acetarsol administration reaches close to the toxic range in urine. Some reports indicate a remission of arsenic which can be physiologically dangerous.

Toxicity 
Some reports indicate that acetarsol can produce effects in the eyes such as optic neuritis and optic atrophy.

References

Antiprotozoal agents
Acetanilides
Arsonic acids
Phenols